Pityrodia byrnesii is a flowering plant in the mint family Lamiaceae and is endemic to Arnhem Land in the Northern Territory. It is a shrub with hairy, glandular stems, stalkless, flat leaves and fragrant, off-white, bell-like flowers with purple stripes inside the tube.

Description
They are sticky due to glandular secretions, smooth on top with a distinct mid-rib on the lower surface.

The tube is off-white in colour with deep purple streaks on the upper lip. The lobes form two "lips" - the upper one with two lobes and the lower one longer with three lobes. The four stamens extend slightly beyond the end of the tube, one pair slightly shorter than the other. Flowering occurs in most months and is followed by an oval-shaped, hairy, sticky fruit.

Taxonomy and naming
Pityrodia byrnesii was first formally described in 1979 by Ahmad Abid Munir from a specimen collected near the East Alligator River crossing in the Northern Territory. The description was published in Journal of the Adelaide Botanic Gardens. The specific epithet ("byrnesii") honours Norman Byrnes, an Australian taxonomist.

Distribution

Conservation
Pityrodia byrnesii is classified as "data deficient" under the Territory Parks and Wildlife Conservation Act 2000.

References

byrnesii
Plants described in 1979
Flora of the Northern Territory